Filipp Fyodorovich Alyabushev (November 13, 1893 – June 25, 1941) was a Soviet major general in World War II. 

He fought in the Imperial Russian Army during World War I. He joined the Bolsheviks in 1918 and fought against the White movement in the subsequent civil war. He later commanded the 14th Rifle Division. He fought in the Soviet-Finnish War. At the start of the Great Patriotic War, he was the commander of the 87th Rifle Division. He was killed only 3 days into the start of Operation Barbarossa. He is reported to have asked that his division be on the frontlines of combat during Operation Barbarossa.

References

1893 births
1941 deaths
People from Kirov Oblast
People from Urzhumsky Uyezd
Frunze Military Academy alumni
Soviet major generals
Russian military personnel of World War I
Soviet military personnel of the Russian Civil War
Soviet military personnel of the Winter War
Soviet military personnel killed in World War II